Alva Tabor Jr. (October 16, 1925 – August 2002) was an American football player and coach.  He served as the head football coach at Wiley College from 1954 to 1955, Fort Valley State University from 1957 to 1959, Southern University from 1969 to 1971, and Virginia State University in 1980, compiling a career college football coaching record of 41–40–4.  Tabor was an assistant at Southern from 1962 to 1966.  In 1967, he became a scout and assistant coach for the New Orleans Saints of the National Football League (NFL).  Tabor was hired in 1972 as an assistant coach in charge of special teams for the Cleveland Browns of the (NFL).  He was the first African-American hired as a full-time coach for the team.

Head coaching record

College

References

1925 births
2002 deaths
American football fullbacks
Cleveland Browns coaches
Fort Valley State Wildcats football coaches
Nevada Wolf Pack football players
New Orleans Saints coaches
Southern Jaguars football coaches
Texas Southern Tigers football coaches
Toronto Argonauts coaches
Tuskegee Golden Tigers football players
Virginia State Trojans football coaches
Wiley Wildcats football coaches
African-American coaches of American football
African-American coaches of Canadian football
African-American players of American football
20th-century African-American sportspeople
21st-century African-American sportspeople